Arthroleptis bivittatus is a species of frog in the family Arthroleptidae. It is endemic to Guinea and only known from the holotype collected from the Tombo Island. It is uncertain whether this species is distinct from the common Arthroleptis poecilonotus. Common name Tumbo-Insel screeching frog has been coined for this species.

Description
The holotype, an adult female, measures  in snout–vent length. The overall appearance is stocky. The tympanum is small (diameter 1.5 mm). Inter-digital webbing is absent. The long-preserved specimen is brown in colour. There are traces of a darker mid-dorsal pattern that could be similar to the hourglass pattern in Arthroleptis poecilonotus. Diffuse, lighter dorsolateral bands are visible.

Habitat and conservation
Not much is known about this species that has not been observed after it was described more than 100 years ago. It is assumed to inhabit lowland forest. Threats to it are unknown.

References

bivittatus
Frogs of Africa
Amphibians of West Africa
Endemic fauna of Guinea
Amphibians described in 1885
Taxa named by Fritz Müller (doctor)
Taxonomy articles created by Polbot